Dathina, the Dathina Sheikhdom, or sometimes the Dathina Confederation, was a state in the British Aden Protectorate, the Federation of Arab Emirates of the South, and its successor, the Federation of South Arabia. Its capital was Mudiyah.

History
The state was abolished on 14 August 1967 upon the founding of the People's Republic of Yemen. In 1990 it became part of the Republic of Yemen.

Rulers
Dathina was ruled for one-year terms by Chairmen of the Council of State who bore the title Na'ib, Ra'is Majlis al-Dawla.
1965 -  6? Apr 1966?       al-Husayn ibn Mansur al-Jabiri 
1966 - 14 Aug 1967         `Abd al-Qadir ibn Shaya

See also
Aden Protectorate

References

External links
Map of Arabia (1905-1923) including the states of Aden Protectorate

States in the Aden Protectorate
Federation of South Arabia
Former monarchies of Asia
Former confederations